The 1994 Illinois Fighting Illini football team represented the University of Illinois at Urbana-Champaign as a member of the Big Ten Conference  during the 1994 NCAA Division I-A football season. Led by third-year head coach Lou Tepper, the Fighting Illini compiled an overall record of 7–5 with a mark of 4–4 in conference play, placing fifth in the Big Ten. Illinois was invited to the Liberty Bowl, where the Illini defeated East Carolina. The team played home games at Memorial Stadium in Champaign, Illinois.

Schedule

Roster

Team players in the NFL

References

Illinois
Illinois Fighting Illini football seasons
Liberty Bowl champion seasons
Illinois Fighting Illini football